Jason Simon (born March 21, 1969) is a Canadian former professional ice hockey player. Simon, who is from the Aamjiwnaang First Nation near Sarnia, Ontario, played five games in the National Hockey League for the Phoenix Coyotes and New York Islanders between 1994 and 1996. The rest of his career, which lasted from 1989 to 2009, was spent in various minor leagues.

Career
Simon was recalled by the New York Islanders on January 6, 1994 and made his NHL debut with the New York Islanders on January 7, 1994. He shared his debut with forwards Dan Plante, Ziggy Palffy, and goaltender Jamie McLennan. Missing from Simon's debut and tenure with the team was Islanders' coach Al Arbour, who was serving a five-game suspension due to Islanders' forward Mick Vukota leaving the bench and participating in an on-ice brawl that occurred during the Islanders' previous game played on January 4, 1994.

The following season, Simon signed with the Winnipeg Jets and played several exhibition games with the team. Simon was involved in a kneeing incident on September 18, 1995, where he was kneed by Bryan Marchment. Marchment would later receive a five-game suspension without pay due to the incident.

In addition to his four-game tenure with the Islanders, Simon would later be recalled to the NHL one more time. He was recalled by the Phoenix (now Arizona) Coyotes on October 30, 1997, playing one game with the team before being returned to Las Vegas the following day.

The following season, Simon was signed by the Colorado Avalanche on August 20, 1997 and briefly attended their training camp. While in training camp, Simon fought enforcer Wade Belak and Wade's brother Graham Belak.

Simon would go on to play for thirty-one teams in his twenty-year career before retiring from hockey in 2009.

Career statistics

Regular season and playoffs

Awards and accomplishments
 1994–95: Turner Cup champion (Denver Grizzlies)
 2007–08: Allan Cup champion (Brantford Blast)

References

External links

1969 births
Living people
Anchorage Aces players
Canadian expatriate ice hockey players in the United States
Canadian ice hockey forwards
Colorado Gold Kings players
Denver Grizzlies players
Detroit Falcons (CoHL) players
Flint Bulldogs players
Hamilton Steelhawks players
Hershey Bears players
Huntsville Havoc players
Ice hockey people from Ontario
Jacksonville Barracudas (SPHL) players
Johnstown Chiefs players
Kingston Raiders players
Las Vegas Thunder players
London Knights players
Louisville Panthers players
Memphis RiverKings players
Nashville Knights players
New Jersey Devils draft picks
New York Islanders players
Port Huron Beacons players
Port Huron Border Cats players
Phoenix Coyotes players
Quebec Rafales players
Salt Lake Golden Eagles (IHL) players
San Diego Gulls (IHL) players
Sportspeople from Sarnia
Springfield Falcons players
Sudbury Wolves players
Utica Devils players
Windsor Spitfires players
First Nations sportspeople